The Motor Rally Mystery is a 1933 detective novel by John Rhode, the pen name of the British writer Cecil Street. It is the fourteenth in his long-running series of novels featuring Lancelot Priestley, a Golden Age armchair detective. It was published in the United States by Dodd Mead under the alternative title Dr. Priestley Lays a Trap. It takes place against the backdrop of the real life RAC Motor Rally, which concluded at Torquay.

Reviewing the novel in The Spectator Dilys Powell concluded "Dr. Priestley as usual takes nothing on trust; and Mr. Rhode achieves a pretty piece of deduction." In the New York Times Isaac Anderson felt "this story is one of the best of the Priestley series, and that is no faint praise."

Synopsis
During an overnight thousand mile motor rally an accident to one of the cars leads to the death of the two occupants. The local police are far from convinced that everything is above board and call in Scotland Yard. The case is led by Inspector Hanslet, but the real work is done  by the criminologist Priestley who retraces the entire journey of care in order to solve the mystery.

References

Bibliography
 Evans, Curtis. Masters of the "Humdrum" Mystery: Cecil John Charles Street, Freeman Wills Crofts, Alfred Walter Stewart and the British Detective Novel, 1920-1961. McFarland, 2014.
 Herbert, Rosemary. Whodunit?: A Who's Who in Crime & Mystery Writing. Oxford University Press, 2003.
 Reilly, John M. Twentieth Century Crime & Mystery Writers. Springer, 2015.

1933 British novels
Novels by Cecil Street
British crime novels
British mystery novels
British detective novels
Collins Crime Club books
Novels set in London
Novels set in Devon